The Republican Majority for Choice (RMC) was a Republican organization in the United States dedicated to preserving legal access to abortion. The group also supported federal funding for all kinds of stem cell research, including embryonic stem cell research.

RMC had a political action committee and supported Republicans across the country who favored abortion rights. The group closed operations in 2018.

The name was chosen to emphasize information based on polling that consistently shows that a majority of Republicans support legal access to abortion in at least some circumstances. In 2009, Gallup reported that 66% of Republicans agreed that abortion should be legal in some (54%) or all (12%) circumstances. A Gallup poll in 2011 found that 27% of Republicans identified themselves as "pro-choice". However, 42% of Republicans support legal abortion during the first trimester. In 2017, Gallup released polling information showing that 36% of Republicans identified as "pro-choice" and 70% agreed that abortion should be legal in some (56%) or all (14%) circumstances.

In 2018, an NBC/Wall St Journal poll found that 52% of Republicans supported the Roe v Wade Supreme Court ruling and did not want said ruling to be overturned.

History
The Republican Majority for Choice began its life as the Republican Coalition for Choice, founded in 1989 by Mary Dent Crisp, former Co-Chair of the Republican National Committee and former National Committeewoman from Arizona.  It was renamed from the Republican Pro-Choice Coalition in 2004 after an American Viewpoint Poll commissioned by Republicans for Choice found that 69% of Republicans strongly agreed with the following statement: "The decision to have an abortion should be between a woman, her doctor and her family. Government should not be involved in making such a personal decision."

The Republican Majority for Choice was allied with other Moderate to Liberal Republican Groups such as The Republican Main Street Partnership, Christine Todd Whitman's It's My Party Too, Ann Stone's Republicans for Choice, the Log Cabin Republicans, The Wish List, Republicans for Environmental Protection, and the Kansas Traditional Republican Majority. In 2018, the RMC announced that it was closing operations and its leadership announced they were leaving the GOP citing the party's anti-abortion platform.

Supported candidates

The following candidates were supported by the Republican Majority for Choice in one or more of their elections. Their status has been updated to reflect their current positions as of the 2010 U.S. elections. As of July 2018, three Republican Senators had identified themselves as "pro-choice", or pro-abortion rights, Shelley Moore Capito, Susan Collins, and Lisa Murkowski. "Collins, Murkowski, and Capito have voted for both pro- and anti-abortion legislation, but all three back the 1973 Roe v. Wade decision legalizing abortion". Capito, Collins, and Murkowski were also three Republicans who opposed an initial bill to repeal the ACA that included a provision for defunding Planned Parenthood.

U.S. Senate
Susan Collins, Maine
Shelley Moore Capito, West Virginia
Lisa Murkowski, Alaska
Scott Brown, Massachusetts (retired)
Lincoln Chaffee, Rhode Island (retired, switched to Democratic Party, then Libertarian Party)
Olympia Snowe, Maine (retired)
Arlen Specter, Pennsylvania (retired, switched to Democratic Party)

U.S. House of Representatives
Lynn Jenkins, Kansas (KS-2) (retired)
Rodney Frelinghuysen New Jersey (NJ-11) (retired)
Charlie Dent, Pennsylvania (PA-15) (retired)

Governors 

 Mitt Romney, Massachusetts (Now a US Senator from Utah, currently identifies as "pro-life" or anti-abortion)

See also

Republicans for Choice
Democrats for Life of America

References

Choice
1988 establishments in the United States
2018 disestablishments in the United States
Political organizations established in 1988
Political organizations disestablished in 2018